Chanda Rubin and Brenda Schultz-McCarthy were the defending champions but only Rubin competed that year with Mary Joe Fernández.

Fernandez and Rubin lost in the semifinals to Lindsay Davenport and Natasha Zvereva.

Davenport and Zvereva won in the final 6–3, 6–2 against Lisa Raymond and Nathalie Tauziat.

Seeds
Champion seeds are indicated in bold text while text in italics indicates the round in which those seeds were eliminated. The top four seeded teams received byes into the second round.

Draw

Finals

Top half

Bottom half

References
 1997 State Farm Evert Cup Doubles Draw

Doubles
1997 Newsweek Champions Cup and the State Farm Evert Cup